Archana may refer to:

 Archana (Hinduism), a type of puja (prayer ritual)
 Archana (moth), a genus of moth
 Archana (film), Indian Malayalam film in 1966

People with the given name
 Archana (actress) (active from 1980), Indian actress and dancer
 Archana (Kannada actress) - Kannada actress 
 Archana Borthakur (born 1983), Indian social worker and writer
 Archana Chandhoke (active from 2002), Tamil television anchor and film actress
 Archana Mahanta (born 1949), Indian folk singer
 Archana Nayak (born 1966), Indian politician
 Archana Puran Singh (born 1962), Indian television presenter, personality and film actress
 Archana Udupa (active from 1998), Indian Kannada singer
 Veda Sastry or Archana (active from 2004), Indian actress